Sir Frederick Whitaker  (23 April 1812 – 4 December 1891) was an English-born New Zealand politician who served twice as the premier of New Zealand and six times as Attorney-General.

Early life
Whitaker was born at the Deanery Manor House, Bampton, Oxfordshire, England, on 23 April 1812, the son of Frederick Whitaker and Susanna Whitaker (née Humfrey). Frederick junior undertook a legal education and became a solicitor and attorney at the age of 27.  A year later he sailed to Australia and then New Zealand. He married Jane Augusta Griffith, stepdaughter of Alexander Shepherd (Colonial Treasurer) at St. Paul's Church in Auckland on 4 March 1843.

Whitaker lived in Auckland and was appointed a County Court judge until this position was abolished in 1844, at which time he returned to work as a lawyer. He was appointed to the General Legislative Council on 3 March 1845 until 22 December of that year. He was then appointed to the Legislative Council of New Ulster Province, but that Council had not met when the new Constitution arrived. He transferred to the new Legislative Council on 26 May 1853 and remained a member until his resignation on 19 December 1864. He was again appointed on 8 October 1879 and remained a member until his death 12 years later. He also served as a major in the militia.

He was elected onto the Auckland Provincial Council on 19 October 1854 for the Suburbs of Auckland electorate, and he served until 25 September 1855. He was appointed to the Auckland Executive Council from 14 March 1854 to 22 January 1855 and was the provincial law officer.

Attorney-General
Whitaker became the first Attorney-General of New Zealand in the Sewell Ministry led by Henry Sewell in 1856. He did not serve as Attorney-General in the subsequent Fox Ministry that was in power for a fortnight, but was again appointed to this position in the Stafford Ministry from 2 June 1856 onwards. He served as Attorney-General until the defeat of the Stafford Ministry on 12 July 1861 and went back to the law. In October 1863 Whitaker was called upon to form a government to replace Premier Domett following his defeat at a vote of no-confidence.

First Premiership
Whitaker's term as Premier lasted just over a year until November 1864. His term ended due to differences between himself and Governor Grey over the conduct of the New Zealand Wars. Whitaker also resigned as a member of the Legislative Council. He served briefly as the member of Parliament for Parnell from 1866 to 1867.

In October 1865 he was elected Superintendent of Auckland Province, which office he held until 1867. Then for nine years he stayed away from public office.

Second Premiership

In 1876 he became MP for Waikato and later Attorney-General again in Atkinson's government; the Atkinson Ministry lasted until October 1877. Whitaker lost his seat in the House in 1879, when he was defeated for Eden. However, when Premier Hall wanted him to serve as Attorney-General again, he was appointed once more to the Legislative Council in 1879. When Hall resigned in April 1882, Whitaker became Premier for the second time, serving until September 1883.

Whitaker was appointed a Knight Commander of the Order of St Michael and St George in 1884 and served again as Attorney-General, and as leader of the Legislative Council from 1887 to 1890. By then his health was failing, and he died in Auckland on 4 December 1891. He was buried at St Stephen's Cemetery in Parnell.

Notes

References

|-

|-

|-

|-

|-

Prime Ministers of New Zealand
Colony of New Zealand judges
19th-century New Zealand judges
Attorneys-General of New Zealand
Members of the New Zealand House of Representatives
Speakers of the New Zealand Legislative Council
Members of the New Zealand Legislative Council
Members of the Auckland Provincial Council
Superintendents of New Zealand provincial councils
English solicitors
1812 births
1891 deaths
People from Bampton, Oxfordshire
New Zealand Knights Commander of the Order of St Michael and St George
Members of Auckland provincial executive councils
English emigrants to New Zealand
Unsuccessful candidates in the 1879 New Zealand general election
New Zealand MPs for Auckland electorates
Burials at St Stephen's Cemetery, Parnell
New Zealand MPs for North Island electorates
Members of the New Zealand Legislative Council (1841–1853)
Attorneys-General of the Colony of New Zealand
New Zealand politicians awarded knighthoods